Cantinflas is a 2014 Mexican biographical comedy drama film directed by Sebastián del Amo. Based on the life of actor and comedian Cantinflas, the film stars Óscar Jaenada as the title character, Michael Imperioli, Ilse Salas, Bárbara Mori, Ana Layevska and Adal Ramones. It premiered on September 18, 2014 in Mexico. In the United States it was released on August 29, 2014. It was selected as the Mexican entry for the Best Foreign Language Film at the 87th Academy Awards, but was not nominated.

On December 12, 2014, José Miguel Insulza, Secretary General of the Organization of American States, gave a recognition to Producer Vidal Cantu and Director Sebastian del Amo in a special screening of Cantinflas in the Hall of  the Americas in Washington, D.C. Ambassadors from the 34 countries members of the OAS were present in the event.

Plot 
Mike Todd has new ideas that will shake the staid world of Hollywood. Mario Moreno is a Mexican comedian who wants to gain international recognition. By chance they become partners, but they never imagine that their project, Around the World in 80 Days, will become a touchstone of world film history .

Cast

Reception

Critical response
Cantinflas received mixed reviews from critics. On Rotten Tomatoes, the film currently has a rating of 45%, based on 20 reviews, with an average rating of 5.6/10. On Metacritic, the film currently has a rating of 45 out of 100, based on 5 critics, indicating "mixed or average reviews".

Accolades

Ariel Awards
The Ariel Awards are awarded annually by the Mexican Academy of Film Arts and Sciences in Mexico. Cantinflas received three awards out of five nominations.

|-
|rowspan="5" scope="row"| 2015
|rowspan="1" scope="row"| Óscar Jaenada
|scope="row"| Best Actor
| 
|-
|scope="row"| Christofer Lagunes
|rowspan="1" scope="row"| Best Art Direction
| 
|-
|scope="row"| Maripaz Robles
|rowspan="1" scope="row"| Best Makeup
| 
|-
|scope="row"| Gabriela Fernández
|rowspan="1" scope="row"| Best Costume Design
| 
|-
|scope="row"| Marco Rodríguez
|rowspan="1" scope="row"| Best Visual Effects
| 
|-

Other awards

See also
 List of submissions to the 87th Academy Awards for Best Foreign Language Film
 List of Mexican submissions for the Academy Award for Best Foreign Language Film

References

External links 

 
Cantinflas Movie on facebook

2014 films
Mexican comedy-drama films
2010s Spanish-language films
Biographical films about actors
Cultural depictions of Elizabeth Taylor
Cultural depictions of Mexican men
Cultural depictions of actors